In convex geometry, the projection body  of a convex body  in n-dimensional  Euclidean space is the convex body such that for any vector , the support function of  in the direction u is the (n – 1)-dimensional volume of the projection of K onto the hyperplane orthogonal to u. 

Minkowski showed that the projection body of a convex body is convex.  and  used projection bodies in their solution to Shephard's problem.

For  a convex body, let  denote the polar body of its projection body. There are two remarkable affine isoperimetric inequality for this body.  proved that for all convex bodies ,

where  denotes any -dimensional simplex, and there is equality precisely for such simplices.

The intersection body IK of K is defined similarly, as the star body such that for any vector u the radial function of IK from the origin in direction u is the (n – 1)-dimensional volume of the intersection of K with the hyperplane u⊥.
Equivalently, the radial function of the intersection body IK is the Funk transform of the radial function of K.

  showed that a centrally symmetric star-shaped body is an intersection body if and only if the function 1/||x|| is a positive definite distribution, where ||x|| is the homogeneous function of degree 1 that is 1 on the boundary of the body, and  used this to show that the unit balls l, 2 < p ≤ ∞ in n-dimensional space with the lp norm are intersection bodies for n=4 but are not intersection bodies for n ≥ 5.

See also

Busemann–Petty problem
Shephard's problem

References

 

Convex geometry